Nikon El Maestro (born 3 June 1993 as Nikon Jevtić) is a retired Serbian-English footballer who played as an attacking midfielder. 
He played in the youth teams of West Ham, Austria Wien, Valencia and Schalke 04. He was the captain of FK Austria Wien U17 Academy teams in the BNZ (National Youth Austrian League).

In March 2014, he took over as head coach of FC Hellas Kagran U11, later taking over as the head coach of the U16 side.

References

External links
 Player profile at HLSZ 
 Player profile at MLSZ 

1993 births
Living people
English people of Serbian descent
Footballers from Belgrade
Serbian footballers
Association football forwards
SC Wiener Neustadt players
Újpest FC players
Korona Kielce players
Nyíregyháza Spartacus FC players
FK Sloga Petrovac na Mlavi players
Serbian expatriate footballers
English expatriate sportspeople in Spain
English expatriate sportspeople in Germany
Expatriate footballers in Austria
Expatriate footballers in Spain
Expatriate footballers in Germany
Expatriate footballers in Hungary
Expatriate footballers in Poland
Serbian expatriate sportspeople in Austria
Serbian expatriate sportspeople in Spain
Serbian expatriate sportspeople in Germany
Serbian expatriate sportspeople in Hungary
Serbian expatriate sportspeople in Poland
English expatriate sportspeople in Poland
English expatriate sportspeople in Austria